Otto Freiherr von Feury  (27 December 1906 – 27 March 1998) is a German politician, representative of the Christian Social Union of Bavaria. He was a member of the Landtag of Bavaria between 1950 and 1978.

See also
List of Bavarian Christian Social Union politicians

Christian Social Union in Bavaria politicians
1906 births
1998 deaths
Grand Crosses with Star and Sash of the Order of Merit of the Federal Republic of Germany